Red beryl, formerly known as bixbite and marketed as red emerald or scarlet emerald, is an extremely rare variety of beryl as well as one of the rarest minerals on Earth. The gem gets its red color from manganese ions embedded inside of beryllium aluminium cyclosilicate crystals. Red Beryl can come in various tints like strawberry, bright ruby, cherry, and orange.

Recently, the red variety of Pezzottaite has been sold in markets as red beryl by some sellers.

Deposits and rarity of the mineral 
Red beryl was discovered in 1904 by Maynard Bixby in the Wah Wah mountains in Utah. In 1912 the gem was named bixbite by Alfred Eppler after Maynard Bixby. The old synonym "bixbite" is deprecated, since it can cause confusion with the mineral bixbyite, a mixed oxide of manganese and iron of chemical formula . 

The greatest concentration of gem-grade red beryl comes from the Ruby-Violet Claim in the Wah Wah Mountains of mid-western Utah, discovered in 1958 by Lamar Hodges, of Fillmore, Utah, while he was prospecting for uranium.

Red beryl is very rare and has been reported only from a handful of locations: Wah Wah Mountains, Paramount Canyon, Round Mountain and Juab County. This gem is also a thousand times more rare than gold. 

According to the Utah Geological Survey they estimated that one red beryl is found for every 150,000 diamonds. According to Gemmological Association of Great Britain a 2 carat red beryl has the same rarity as a 40 carat diamond.

Red beryl is said to be roughly the same price or more valuable than emerald although it is a hundred times rarer than emerald. Its rarity has made it less popular but red beryl crystals that are over 1 carat can sell for US$ 20,000. In 2008, one carat could sell for US$ 5,000 or more.

Characteristics 
Red beryl rough crystals can be easily distinguished by hexagonal crystal systems. This gem has been known to be confused with pezzottaite, a caesium analog of beryl, that has been found in Madagascar and more recently Afghanistan; cut gems of the two varieties can be distinguished from their difference in refractive index.  Like emerald and unlike most other varieties of beryl, red beryl is usually highly included.

Red beryl has inclusions like feathers and fractures. Some mineral inclusions include quartz, feldspar, hematite, and bixbyite.

Formation 
While gem beryls are ordinarily found in pegmatites and certain metamorphic rock, red beryl forms in topaz-bearing rhyolites. It is formed by crystallizing under low pressure and high temperature from a pneumatolytic phase along fractures or within near-surface miarolitic cavities of the rhyolite. Associated minerals include bixbyite, quartz, orthoclase, topaz, spessartine, pseudobrookite and hematite. The dark red color is attributed to  ions. Synthetic red beryl is also produced.

References 

Beryl group
Hexagonal minerals